Dorcadion glycyrrhizae is a species of beetle in the family Cerambycidae. It was described by Pallas in 1773.

Subspecies
 Dorcadion glycyrrhizae androsovi Suvorov, 1909
 Dorcadion glycyrrhizae dostojewskii Semenov, 1899
 Dorcadion glycyrrhizae dubianskii Jakovlev, 1906
 Dorcadion glycyrrhizae fedorenkoi Danilevsky, 2001
 Dorcadion glycyrrhizae galinae Danilevsky, 2001
 Dorcadion glycyrrhizae glycyrrhizae (Pallas, 1773)
 Dorcadion glycyrrhizae guberlensis Danilevsky, 2006
 Dorcadion glycyrrhizae iliense Plavilstshikov, 1937
 Dorcadion glycyrrhizae inderiense Suvorov, 1911
 Dorcadion glycyrrhizae korshikovi Danilevsky, 2006
 Dorcadion glycyrrhizae nemkovi Danilevsky, 2006
 Dorcadion glycyrrhizae nikireevi Danilevsky, 2001
 Dorcadion glycyrrhizae obtusipenne Motschulsky, 1860
 Dorcadion glycyrrhizae striatum (Goeze, 1777)
 Dorcadion glycyrrhizae tobolense Danilevsky, 2001
 Dorcadion glycyrrhizae turgaicum Suvorov, 1915
 Dorcadion glycyrrhizae uvarovi Suvorov, 1911

See also 
Dorcadion

References

glycyrrhizae
Beetles described in 1773
Taxa named by Peter Simon Pallas